Baptist Parsonage, also known as Archbell House, is a historic Baptist church parsonage located at 211 S. McLewean Street in Kinston, Lenoir County, North Carolina. It was built about 1858, and is a two-story, double-pile, center-hall-plan Greek Revival style frame dwelling. It is sheathed with weatherboard siding, has a hipped roof, and paired stuccoed interior chimneys.

It was listed on the National Register of Historic Places in 1989.

References

Baptist churches in North Carolina
Houses on the National Register of Historic Places in North Carolina
Churches completed in 1858
19th-century Baptist churches in the United States
Houses in Lenoir County, North Carolina
National Register of Historic Places in Lenoir County, North Carolina
Clergy houses in the United States